"Destination Nowhere" is the second single released by Japanese singer Erika Sawajiri under the alias Erika.

Single information
The single was released in two editions: a first press/limited edition and a regular edition. The regular edition contains the B-sides "ESCAPE", "FREE -overrocket101007 mix-", and the instrumental for "Destination Nowhere". The first press/limited edition contains the music video for "Destination Nowhere". The album jacket covers for both versions are different.

The main song "Destination Nowhere" was used for the TV Asahi 2007 fall drama Mop Girl theme song.
The making-of video for "Destination Nowhere" was released on 31 October 2007, and the full video aired on MTV Japan on 5 November 2007.

Track list

Charts

References

External links
 Erika - Official Website
 Oricon Website

2007 singles
Japanese television drama theme songs
2007 songs